The Gold Coast Guineas is a Gold Coast Turf Club Group 3 Australian Thoroughbred horse race for three-year-olds, under set weights conditions, over a distance of 1200 metres at Gold Coast Racecourse, Surfers Paradise, Queensland, Australia during the Queensland Winter Racing Carnival. Total prize money for the race is A$150,000.

History
The inaugural running of the race was in March 2000 over a distance of 1400 metres. The race is now part of the Prime Minister's Cup racecard in May.

Distance
2000–2005 – 1400 metres
2006 onwards - 1200 metres

Grade
2006–2007 - Listed race
2008 onwards - Group 3

Winners

 2022 - Prince Of Boom
 2021 - Marboosha
 2020 - Hightail
 2019 - Pennino
 2018 - Champagne Cuddles 
 2017 - Savanna Amour
 2016 - Takedown
 2015 - Nostradamus
 2014 - Dothraki
 2013 - Academus
 2012 - Florentina
 2011 - Military Rose
 2010 - Beethog
 2009 - Chakvetadze
 2008 - El Cambio
 2007 - Gold Edition  
 2006 - Fashions Afield  
 2005 - Eremein  
 2004 - King's Chapel   
 2003 - Tahitian Star  
 2002 - Miss Bussell   
 2001 - Ceffyl 
 2000 - Make Mine Magic

See also

 List of Australian Group races
 Group races

References

Horse races in Australia
Sport on the Gold Coast, Queensland